Sacco and Vanzetti is a 2001 opera by Marc Blitzstein and Leonard Lehrman.

Development 

In 1959, composer Marc Blitzstein began work on what he expected to be his magnum opus: a three-act opera based on the case of Sacco and Vanzetti. The Metropolitan Opera commissioned the opera with a Ford Foundation grant, but the production was canceled in September 1960 by the National Federation of Music Clubs for Blitzstein's membership in the Communist Party throughout the 1940s. The opera remained unfinished upon Blitzstein's murder in 1964. Another composer, Leonard Lehrman, an associate of Blitzstein, finished the work almost four decades later as it premiered in 2001 in Connecticut.

References

Further reading 

 
 
 

Operas by Marc Blitzstein
2001 operas
Works about Sacco and Vanzetti
English-language operas
Operas set in the United States
Operas set in the 20th century
Operas